Luzenac is a commune in the Ariège department in southwestern France. Luzenac-Garanou station has rail connections to Toulouse, Foix and Latour-de-Carol.

Population

Sports
 Luzenac is also home to the football club Luzenac AP.

See also
Communes of the Ariège department

References

Communes of Ariège (department)
Ariège communes articles needing translation from French Wikipedia